The Agora Grand Event Center is a large event venue in Lewiston, Maine and is also the second tallest building in the state. 

The Agora Grand was created by renovating the former St. Patrick's Church, a Roman Catholic church whose cornerstone was laid on 24 July 1887 by the Right Reverend Bishop Healy and last Mass was held in October, 2009.  At 220 feet to its taller spire, it is the second tallest building in Maine, based on the definition of "height to architectural top" by the Council on Tall Buildings and Urban Habitat.  It was purchased in March, 2014, by developer Andrew Knight, who opened the Agora Grand in May, 2016.  Knight's wedding was the first at the venue and he received an award from the Lewiston Historic Preservation Board for his work in reviving the building.

In 2014, Knight converted the former St. Patrick's Church Rectory, also known as the Albert Kelsey Mansion, into a boutique hotel.  The former church contains a mortuary chapel and basement crypt in which the church's original builder and priest, Monsignor Thomas Wallace, was buried from 1906 to 2007, when his body was exhumed and moved to Mt. Hope Cemetery.  In 2015, Knight converted the former crypt into a novelty annex of the Inn at the Agora, reportedly the world's first 'crypt hotel room.'

1896 description

An 1896 account in The Sacred Heart Review describes the structure:
St. Patrick's Church, a beautiful Gothic structure of brick, with rockfaced granite foundations, has an unsurpassed situation, as it faces directly on the public park and stands commandingly over the lower levels of the city, surmounted as it is by two graceful spires that rise to heights of 220 and 160 feet respectively. It is 180 feet long and 65 feet wide, and has a comfortable seating capacity of 1,000. It is a seven-bay edifice, its brick buttresses being doubly barged in cut granite ; and the side walls are further trimmed in white North Jay granite at the springs and tips of the window-arches.

See also 

 List of tallest buildings by U.S. state and territory
 List of tallest buildings in Maine

References

Residential buildings completed in 1890
Skyscrapers in Maine
Former Roman Catholic church buildings in Maine
1890 establishments in Maine
Roman Catholic churches in Lewiston, Maine